Taintor is a surname. Notable people with the surname include:

Anne Taintor (born 1953), American artist
John Taintor Foote (1881–1950), American novelist, playwright, short-story writer, and screenwriter
Mitchell Taintor (born 1994), American soccer player

See also
 Tainter (disambiguation)